Thomas Kristensen (born 2 May 1990) is a Norwegian handball player. He plays for Haslum HK and the Norwegian national team. He has spent his entire career in Haslum, except for the seasons 2014–2015 in Ademar León and 2015–2016 in Frisch Auf Göppingen.

As of 2016 he currently has 8 gold medals from the Norwegian league with Haslum HK and 1 gold medal from the EHF-cup with Frisch Auf Göppingen.

He competed at the 2016 European Men's Handball Championship.

References

1990 births
Living people
Sportspeople from Bærum
Norwegian male handball players
Norwegian expatriate sportspeople in Germany
Norwegian expatriate sportspeople in Spain
Expatriate handball players
CB Ademar León players
Frisch Auf Göppingen players
Handball-Bundesliga players